Amt Niemegk is an Amt ("collective municipality") in the district of Potsdam-Mittelmark, in Brandenburg, Germany. Its seat is in Niemegk.

The Amt Niemegk consists of the following municipalities:
Mühlenfließ
Niemegk 
Planetal
Rabenstein

Demography

References 

Niemegk
Potsdam-Mittelmark